Aneurin Owen may refer to:
 Aneurin Owen (antiquarian)
 Aneurin Owen (rugby union)